The GiMA Best Engineer – Film Album is given by Global Indian Music Academy as a part of its annual Global Indian Music Academy Awards to recognise a music engineer who has delivered an outstanding performance in a film.

Superlatives

List of winners
 2010 Eric Pillai  – Love Aaj Kal
 2011 Eric Pillai – Dabangg
 Eric Pillai - I Hate Luv Storys
 Eric Pillai - Once Upon A Time In Mumbaai
 Eric Pillai, Pramod Chandorkar, Shaitus Joseph - Raajneeti
 Vijay Dayal - Band Baaja Baaraat
 2012 Hentry Kuruvilla, P. A. Deepak, S.Sivakumar, T.R. Krishna Chetan – Rockstar
 Dipesh Sharma, Vijay Dayal - Agneepath
 Abhijit Vaghani, Eric Pillai, Mark 'Exit' Goodchild, Vijay Dayal, Warren Mendonsa - Ra.One
 Vijay Benegal - Don 2
 Vijay Benegal - Zindagi Na Milegi Dobara
 2013 – (no award given)
 2014 Eric Pillai – Aashiqui 2
 Eric Pillai, Shadab Rayeen - Yeh Jawaani Hai Deewani
 R Nitish Kumar - Raanjhanaa
 Tanay Gajjar  - Goliyon Ki Raasleela Ram-Leela
 2015 Eric Pillai – Ek Villain
 Eric Pillai – CityLights
 Eric Pillai – Dedh Ishqiya
 R Nitish Kumar, TR Krishna Chetan – Highway
 Tanay Gajjar – 2 States
 2016 Tanay Gajjar – Bajirao Mastani
 Eric Pillai – ABCD 2
 Eric Pillai – Badlapur
 Eric Pillai, Shadab Rayeem – Dilwale
 Tanay Gajjar – Dil Dhadakne Do

See also
 Bollywood
 Cinema of India

References

Global Indian Music Academy Awards
Album awards